Mili may refer to:

Film
 Mili (1975 film), a Bollywood romantic drama film directed by Hrishikesh Mukherjee
 Mili (2015 film), a Malayalam-language drama film directed by Rajesh Raman Pillai
 Mili (2022 film), a Bollywood survival thriller film directed by Mathukutty Xavier

People

Family name 

 Farhana Mili, Bangladeshi film and television actress
 Itula Mili (born 1973), American football player
 Lamine Mili, American electrical engineer
 Mohamed Ezzedine Mili (1917–2013), Tunisian diplomat
 Stavroula Mili, Greek molecular biologist

Given name 

 MILI, Indian singer-songwriter
 Mili Avital (born 1972), Israeli actress, writer, and director
 Mili Hadžiabdić (born 1963), Yugoslav footballer
 Mili Smith (born 1998), Scottish curler
 Mili Urién, fictional character in the Argentine telenovela Chiquititas
 Pili and Mili (born 1947), Spanish comic acting duo

Other uses
Mili, a form of Chinese veil
Mili, Japanese classical indie music group
Mili Airport, public use airstrip in the Marshall Islands
Mili Atoll, a coral atoll of 92 islands in the Pacific Ocean which forms a legislative district of the Ratak Chain of the Marshall Islands
Mili language, a Loloish language spoken in Jingdong County
 Mili Pictures Worldwide, a Shanghai feature film animation company

See also
 Milli (disambiguation)
 Millis (disambiguation)